Joceline Schriemer is a Canadian politician. She was elected to represent the electoral district of Saskatoon Sutherland in the Legislative Assembly of Saskatchewan in the 2007 election. She is a member of the Saskatchewan Party.

Schriemer was born and raised in Montmartre, Saskatchewan. Prior to being elected to office, she worked as an emergency medical technician and a police officer with the Saskatoon Police Service.

In June 2010, Schriemer announced that she would not seek re-election in the 2011 general election in order to seek a return to policing.

References

Living people
Saskatchewan Party MLAs
Women MLAs in Saskatchewan
Politicians from Saskatoon
21st-century Canadian politicians
21st-century Canadian women politicians
Year of birth missing (living people)